A peroneal strike is a temporarily disabling blow to the common fibular (peroneal) nerve of the leg, just above the knee. The attacker aims roughly a hand span above the exterior side of the knee, towards the back of the leg. This causes a temporary loss of motor control of the leg, accompanied by numbness and a painful tingling sensation from the point of impact all the way down the leg, usually lasting anywhere from 30 seconds to 5 hours in duration.

The strike is commonly made with the knee, a baton, or shin kick, but can be done by anything forcefully impacting the nerve. The technique is a part of the pressure point control tactics used in martial arts and by law enforcement agents.

The peroneal strike was used against detainees during the 2002 Bagram torture and prisoner abuse scandal.

See also
Charley horse
Pain compliance
Kubotan

References

Law enforcement techniques
Violence